Wat Borom Niwat Ratchaworawihan; also simple known as Wat Borom Niwat or Wat Borom) is a second class royal Thai Buddhist temple, located in the Rong Mueang Subdistrict, Pathum Wan District, downtown Bangkok.

Wat Borom Niwat is a temple that King Mongkut (Rama IV) when he was ordained as a monk ordered to be built in the year 1834 under the name "Wat Borommasuk" (วัดบรมสุข). The original status of this temple was aranwasi (อรัญวาสี; "dwelling in the forest"), in pair with Wat Bowonniwet Vihara, which was a khamwasi (คามวาสี; "dwelling in the community") in Bang Lamphu area in Rattanakosin Island. Due to the location of Wat Borom Niwat in those days, considered as a suburb Bangkok. Originally, it has only a main hall, pagoda and 14 monk's dwellings.

The temple was renovated in the reign of King Chulalongkorn (Rama V) and renamed to "Wat Borom Niwat" as today.

Interior main hall enshrined principal Buddha statue in Māravijaya attitude named "Phra Thotsaphonlayan" (พระทศพลญาณ; lit: "tenfold power Buddha"). The mural paintings are the works of Khrua In Khong, the grand master artist in reign of King Mongkut. These murals are hidden by dharma puzzles of Buddhism in Western style art.

This temple, when taking a train from Bangkok railway station (Hua Lamphong) will pass through the gate. Because it is located next to the railways and close to Yotse bridge and Bobae market as well.

References

Pathum Wan district
Buddhist temples in Bangkok
Thai Theravada Buddhist temples and monasteries
Registered ancient monuments in Bangkok
19th-century Buddhist temples
Religious buildings and structures completed in 1834
1834 establishments in Siam